Patryk Wajda (born May 20, 1988) is a Polish ice hockey player for Cracovia and the Polish national team.

Career statistics

Regular season and playoffs

International

References

External links

1988 births
KH Sanok players
MKS Cracovia (ice hockey) players
Living people
Polish ice hockey defencemen
Place of birth missing (living people)